The 1964 French Championships (now known as the French Open) was a tennis tournament that took place on the outdoor clay courts at the Stade Roland-Garros in Paris, France. The tournament ran from 19 May until 30 May. It was the 68th staging of the French Championships, and the second Grand Slam tennis event of 1964. Manuel Santana and Margaret Smith won the singles titles.

Finals

Men's singles

 Manuel Santana defeated  Nicola Pietrangeli 6–3, 6–1, 4–6, 7–5

Women's singles

 Margaret Smith defeated  Maria Bueno 5–7, 6–1, 6–2

Men's doubles

 Roy Emerson /   Ken Fletcher defeated  John Newcombe /  Tony Roche 7–5, 6–3, 3–6, 7–5

Women's doubles

 Margaret Smith /  Lesley Turner defeated  Norma Baylon /  Helga Schultze 6–3, 6–1

Mixed doubles

 Margaret Smith /  Ken Fletcher defeated  Lesley Turner /  Fred Stolle  6–3, 4–6, 8–6

References

External links
 French Open official website

French Championships
French Championships (tennis) by year
French Championships (tennis)
French Championships (tennis)
French Championships (tennis)